David Cook is a Republican politician elected to serve in the Arizona House of Representatives from the 7th legislative district. He was first elected to the state House in 2016 and represents central and eastern Pinal County and southern Gila County.

Early life and career 
Cook was born in Ponca City, Oklahoma. As a child, he was involved in 4-H and Future Farmers of America. He moved to Arizona in 1985 and graduated from Miami High School. Cook attended three community colleges: Eastern Arizona College, Rio Salado College, and Central Arizona College. Cook also attended Arizona State University's Certified Public Manager program. He worked for the Arizona Department of Corrections for 12 years. In 2000 he and his wife founded the DC Cattle Company.

Political career

Arizona House of Representatives 
In the House of Representatives Cook is a member of the committees on commerce; land, agriculture and rural affairs; military affairs and public safety; and transportation.

On June 7, 2021, Cook was the sole Republican to vote alongside every Democratic member of the House of Representatives against House Bill 2900, which would have established a 2.5% flat tax in Arizona, killing the bill.

2020 presidential election 

Following the 2020 United States presidential election, Cook supported the "Stop the Steal" movement which falsely claimed that Donald Trump won the election nationally and in Arizona.

Elections 
In 2016 Cook and incumbent T. J. Shope defeated Democratic Party candidate Carmen Casillas in the Arizona House of Representatives general election in Arizona's 8th legislative district. In 2020 Cook and Shope were elected over Casillas and fellow Democratic candidate Linda C. Gross. In 2020 Cook and fellow Republican candidate Frank Pratt were elected over Democratic candidates Sharon Girard and Cristefano Lessard.

Personal life 
Cook lives in Globe. He married his wife, Diana in 2000; the couple have two children. He is a member of the National Rifle Association and the Knights of Columbus.

2018 arrest 
On December 19, 2018, Cook was arrested for driving under the influence (DUI) by an Arizona Department of Public Safety trooper in Mesa, Arizona after the officer spotted Cook's vehicle moving out of its lane. When asked to step out of the vehicle, Cook responded with “Do you know what you’re doing, son? You’re making a mistake.”  Cook was arrested with a blood alcohol content of between 0.152 percent and  0.158 percent, well above the state limit of 0.08 percent.  When the officer informed Cook that he would lose his driver's license, he responded with "I’m fine; don’t worry, you’ll get yours".

In a plea bargain, appearing before a former Arizona state representative, he received a sentence of one day in jail, a fine, plus probation with conditions including no excessive drinking for five years, and he completed a 16-hour online DUI course.

References 

Living people
Republican Party members of the Arizona House of Representatives
Place of birth missing (living people)
Year of birth missing (living people)
People from Ponca City, Oklahoma
21st-century American politicians
Arizona politicians convicted of crimes
People from Globe, Arizona